Norman Christopher Barry (December 25, 1897 – October 13, 1988) was an American judge, politician, and football coach.

Political and judicial career
Barry was born in Chicago, Illinois. He went to the Chicago public schools and then went to the Notre Dame preparatory school for thirteen years, from grade school to law school. He then received his law degree from the Notre Dame Law School and was admitted to the Illinois bar in 1928. Barry was involved with the Democratic Party in Chicago. Barry served in the Illinois Senate from 1943 until 1953. He then served as an Illinois circuit court judge for Cook County, Illinois from 1953 until his retirement in 1978. He then resumed practicing law in Chicago. He died on October 13, 1988, at Northwestern Memorial Hospital after suffering a heart attack while at his law office.

Football career
He was the head coach for the National Football League's Chicago Cardinals from 1925 to 1926. With Norman Barry as head coach the Cardinals outdistanced a field of 20 teams to win their first NFL championship in 1925 by virtue of the league's best record. In two seasons, he compiled a record of 16–8–2. Prior to his coaching career, he played in the early NFL for the Cardinals, Green Bay Packers and Milwaukee Badgers. Barry was George Gipp's teammate at the University of Notre Dame.

References

External links

1897 births
1988 deaths
American football halfbacks
American football quarterbacks
Chicago Cardinals head coaches
Green Bay Packers players
Milwaukee Badgers players
Notre Dame Fighting Irish football players
Notre Dame Fighting Irish baseball players
Notre Dame Fighting Irish men's track and field athletes
Notre Dame Law School alumni
Democratic Party Illinois state senators
Illinois state court judges
Lawyers from Chicago
Politicians from Chicago
Sportspeople from Chicago
Players of American football from Chicago
20th-century American politicians
American athlete-politicians
20th-century American judges
20th-century American lawyers